CyberGraphX (pronounced "cybergraphics"), is the standard ReTargetable Graphics API available for the Amiga and compatible systems. It was developed by Thomas Sontowski and Frank Mariak and later adopted by Phase5 for use with their graphics cards. Many other graphics card manufacturers who offered hardware for Amiga and compatible systems used it as well.

Versions 
The latest version is CyberGraphX V5 used in MorphOS. Its features include:

 AltiVec accelerated
 Display Data Channel (DDC) and gamma correction support
 Hardware accelerated operations for alpha blending, tinting, gradients, stretching
 PowerPC native, with support for AmigaOS drivers

The original CyberGraphX software for AmigaOS is no longer actively maintained. CyberGraphX V4 was the last release for that platform so far. AROS implements CyberGraphX V4 compatible API. Alternative RTG APIs are Picasso 96 and Enhanced Graphics System, the first is used in AmigaOS4 and implements the CyberGraphX V4 API with some V5 extensions.

Dual monitor support 
 AGP-Radeon + PCI-Radeon: fail
 AGP-Radeon + PCI-Voodoo: ok (Apple Open Firmware only)
 AGP-Voodoo + PCI-Voodoo: unknown
 AGP-Voodoo + PCI-Radeon: ok

Up to 2560×1600 running on Dual-link DVI, for example a Radeon 9650 with 256 MB

Drivers and libraries 

 cgxsystem.library
 cgxbootpic.library
 cgxdither.library
 cgxvideo.library
 (cybpci.library)
 ddc.library
 cgx3drave.library
 cgxmpeg.library

References 

 MorphOS 2.0 release notes

External links 

 
 Selection of CyberGraphX drivers at the Unofficial phase5 Support Page

AmigaOS
Amiga
Amiga APIs
Graphics libraries
MorphOS